The Child Protection Party is a registered minor political party in South Australia led by Tony Tonkin. Its platform is based around child protection.

The party unsuccessfully ran 2 upper house candidates at the 2018 state election with around 1.5% of the statewide vote.

The party unsuccessfully ran 1 lower house candidate in the Federal election of June 2019.  The party was deregistered at a federal level on the 30th of June 2021.

References

External links
Child Protection Party official website

Defunct political parties in South Australia